An earthquake struck Ljubljana, the capital and largest city of Carniola, a crown land of Austria-Hungary and the capital of modern-day Slovenia, on Easter Sunday, 14 April 1895. It was the most, and the last, destructive earthquake in the area.

Earthquake
With a Richter magnitude of 6.1 and a maximum Mercalli Intensity of VIII–IX, the earthquake struck at 20:17 UTC (22:17 local time). More than 100 aftershocks followed in the next ten days.

Damage
At the time, Ljubljana's population was some 31,000, with around 1,400 buildings. About ten percent of buildings were damaged or destroyed, although few people died in the destruction. On Vodnik Square, an old monastery, which contained a diocesan girls' college and a library was sufficiently damaged that it had to be razed, and the site eventually was turned into an outdoor market (Ljubljana Central Market), now an important site in the city. The damage was estimated to 7 million florins.

Response
The next morning, the Municipal Council adopted emergency measures to assist the worst-affected victims, to direct the police force in extra security measures, and to direct the police force to inspect the damaged houses. All the city's schools were temporarily closed, and some factories temporarily ceased operation. A few days later, emergency shelters were created for the homeless. Many citizens of Ljubljana left the city as refugees. Lack of food was quickly felt in the city, and five emergency kitchens were established, which were free or low cost and distributed several thousand hot meals each day. Other areas of the Austro-Hungarian Empire, especially Vienna, the Czech Lands and Croatia-Slavonia assisted in the aid. Among the individual members of the Municipal Council, the Liberal Nationalist Ivan Hribar, showed particular organizational abilities in providing aid. Shortly thereafter, he was elected mayor and organized the town's extensive reconstruction. The damage was substantial. Most houses were damaged on Hospice Street (Špitalska ulica, today Stritar Street), where all houses were destroyed except for one, and the markets.

Post-earthquake development
Until the event, Ljubljana had a provincial appearance. Expansion of the city and a widespread Vienna Secession architectural change began, which today is juxtaposed against the earlier Baroque style buildings that remain. Many buildings, such as the Mladika, were constructed in the aftermath. The rebuilding period between 1896 and 1910 is referred to as the "revival of Ljubljana" not just because of these architectural changes from which a great deal of the city dates back to today, but for reform of urban administration, health, education and tourism that followed. From 1895 to 1910, 436 new buildings were created and hundreds of buildings were renovated or extended in the Vienna Secession style. Most of Ljubljana's bridges, monuments, parks, and main buildings date back to the post-earthquake development. A chapel, dedicated to Our Lady of the Rosary, was erected in 1895 in Janče by the people of Ljubljana so that Mary would protect them from such disasters. In 1897, the first Austro-Hungarian seismological observatory was established in Ljubljana at Vega Street.

See also
 List of historical earthquakes
List of earthquakes in Slovenia

References

Ljubljana
Events in Ljubljana
Ljubljana Earthquake, 1895
19th century in Carniola
1895 in Austria-Hungary
April 1895 events